Richard Joseph Carter (August 31, 1916 – September 11, 1969) was an American professional baseball pitcher, outfielder, coach, and manager. Born in Philadelphia, Pennsylvania, he was a graduate of Olney High School.

Carter's minor league playing career occurred during the World War II manpower shortage, and immediately after the war as a playing manager. He spent 1959 and part of 1960 in Major League Baseball as a coach for the Philadelphia Phillies, resigning on May 30, 1960, because of poor health.

Carter managed in the Phils' minor league system from 1947–52 and 1956–58, and also served as a scout for the team. His 1956 Schenectady Blue Jays won the championship of the Class A Eastern League.

He died in Ocean City, New Jersey, at the age of 53.

References

External links

Coach's page from Retrosheet

1916 births
1969 deaths
Baseball coaches from Pennsylvania
Baseball players from Philadelphia
Baton Rouge Red Sticks players
Dover Phillies players
Major League Baseball third base coaches
Minor league baseball managers
Philadelphia Phillies coaches
Philadelphia Phillies scouts
Schenectady Blue Jays players
Trenton Packers players
Wilmington Blue Rocks (1940–1952) players